Houphouët-Boigny Bridge is a road and rail bridge over the Ébrié Lagoon which links the two halves of the city Abidjan in Ivory Coast.

References

External links
 

Bridges in Ivory Coast
Bridges completed in 1954
Bridges completed in 1957
Road-rail bridges
Buildings and structures in Abidjan